Prime STH were a Swedish alternative rock quartet from Stockholm, Sweden. The band, which included vocalist Noa Modén, guitarist Martin Påhlsson, bassist Jesper Eksjoo, and drummer Kasper Lindgren, was formed while the members were teenagers. They have released two studio albums: Underneath the Surface (2001) and Beautiful Awakening (2004). Their most popular song "I'm Stupid (Don't Worry 'Bout Me)", a single from Underneath the Surface, was written by Max Martin and reached the top 30 of the Billboard Alternative Songs and Mainstream Rock charts.

Career

2001: Underneath the Surface
On 26 June 2001, the band released their debut album, Underneath the Surface, on Giant/Warner Bros.. In the United States, it was released the week of 9 July 2001, by Reprise Records. The album received generally mixed reviews from music critics, holding a score of 60 out of 100 on review aggregator Album of the Year. A review by Devon Powers of PopMatters praised the album's range and called it "not your little sister’s alternative rock band". Slant critic Aaron Scott awarded the album two stars out of five and criticized the way that the album "straddles the line between pop and hard rock", although praising the album's catchiness.

The album also spawned the single "I'm Stupid (Don't Worry 'Bout Me)", which was written by Max Martin. On the Billboard Mainstream Rock Tracks chart dated 2 June 2001, the single debuted at number 40, while it debuted at number 38 on the Alternative Songs chart the following week. On the chart dated 21 July 2001, the track attained a peak of number 28 on both charts, holding the spot for three weeks on Mainstream Rock and one week on Alternative.

In March 2003, Prime STH played at New York City's historic CBGB club for a two-day showcase of Swedish artists titled "The Swedish Invasion Continues ... 2003".

2004: Beautiful Awakening
The band released their second studio album, Beautiful Awakening, in March 2004 in Scandinavia via Swedish label MVG/Push Music. It was released in the rest of Europe on 4 April via German label Nuclear Blast, while it was released in Japan on 5 September via Wood Records. As of October 2004, Billboard reported that they were looking for distribution for the album in the United States.

Members
Adapted from AllMusic and PopMatters.
 Noa Medon — vocalist, guitarist
 Martin Påhlsson — guitarist
 Jesper Eksjoo (JSPR) — bassist
 Kasper Lindgren (Kaz) — drummer

Discography

Albums
 Underneath the Surface, (26 June 2001 release on Reprise Records/Warner Bros. Records)
 Beautiful Awakening, (5 April 2004 release on Nuclear Blast)

Singles
2001, "I'm Stupid (Don't Worry 'Bout Me)", U.S. Billboard Alternative Songs No. 28; U.S. Billboard Mainstream Rock Tracks No. 28

References

External links
Prime STH on MySpace

Swedish alternative metal musical groups
Nuclear Blast artists